The Bristol child sex abuse ring was a group of 13 men who committed sexual offences against underage teenage girls in Bristol, in Southwestern England. In November 2014, they were convicted of offences including rape, paying a child for sex, causing or inciting child prostitution, sexual acts with children and sex trafficking.

Crimes
The men abused and prostituted their victims across Bristol, using hotels, private houses, parks and public toilets. Some were drug-dealers selling heroin and cocaine, while others were described as "well-educated men with good prospects". As in similar sex-abuse cases in other parts of Britain, their victims were typically "vulnerable girls" who were supposedly under local authority care. The gang coerced the girls into sex with small payments of money, gifts of drugs and alcohol, and by persuading them that having sex with many men was part of "Somali 'culture and tradition.

In a police interview, Said Zakaria referred to two thirteen-year-old victims of one incident of abuse as "dirty slags" who knew that their function was to "suck dick and then fuck off". He had trafficked a "small 13-year-old girl" to a "sex party" in a hotel room in Bristol, where he raped her twice in what the trial judge, Julian Lambert, described as a "rough, callous and very nasty manner" and using "significant" force. Zakaria left the girl "totally humiliated and bleeding". The girl was then raped again by Jusuf Abdirazak, whom the judge described as acting "without humanity and with no pity whatsoever".

Perpetrators

A total of thirteen men were convicted, their names, convictions and sentences are listed below.

Reaction in Bristol

The Guardian reported that the case had caused "huge concern" in Bristol and sent "shockwaves" through the close-knit Somali community there. Muna Abdi, chair of the Bristol Somali Forum, said that the offences were "evil acts ... utterly condemned" by the community. Hugh Sherriffe, regional director for the children's charity Barnardo's, said the case was the "tip of the iceberg" and that similar sexual abuse was still taking place in Bristol and across the rest of the country. Police in Bristol have active investigations under way into similar sex crimes committed by "49 other suspects" of "various communities and ethnic backgrounds".

Responding to the convictions, a local headteacher wrote in The Guardian'''s dedicated education section of how "schools can't cope with the tide of child sexual exploitation". The headteacher expressed dismay at the way in which the perceived ethnicity of the offenders had harmed race relations in Bristol and described how it had been necessary to devote the month before the verdict to "redoubling our focus on combating racism". The headteacher noted how already "struggling" communities had been further demoralised by a "case on this scale" and spoke of feeling "dread" at "what else is out there".

See also
List of sexual abuses perpetrated by groups

References

External links
13 men guilty of enforced prostitution and rape of vulnerable girls in Bristol, The Guardian, 27 November 2014
Bristol sex gang: The horrifying ordeals of the brave 13-year-old who came forward, The Independent, 27 November 2014
A gang who were part of an inner city sex ring involving the abuse, rape and prostitution of British girls have been jailed for more than 40 years, The Evening Standard, 28 November 2014
‘Schools can’t cope with the tide of child sexual exploitation’, The Guardian'', 2 December 2014

Child prostitution in the United Kingdom
Crime in Bristol
Forced prostitution
Sex gangs
Rape in England
Sex crimes in England
Child sexual abuse in England
British people convicted of child sexual abuse
2014 in England
2014 in British law
Incidents of violence against girls